Elizabeth Bacon Custer (née Bacon; April 8, 1842 – April 4, 1933) was an American author and public speaker, and the wife of Brevet Major General George Armstrong Custer, United States Army. She spent most of their marriage in relative proximity to him despite his numerous military campaigns in the American Civil War and subsequent postings on the Great Plains as a commanding officer in the United States Cavalry.

Left nearly destitute in the aftermath of her husband's death, she became an outspoken advocate for his legacy through her popular books and lectures. Largely as a result of her decades of campaigning on his behalf, General Custer's image as the gallant fallen hero amid the glory of Custer's Last Stand was a canon of American history for almost a century after his death.

Elizabeth Custer never remarried and died in 1933, four days short of her 91st birthday. She has been portrayed by a number of actresses, starting in the 1940s in films and later on television.

Early years 
Elizabeth "Libbie" Bacon was born in Monroe, Michigan, in 1842, the daughter of a wealthy and influential judge and state representative, Daniel Bacon (b. 1798). Her father had profitable investments in real estate and other business ventures.

Tragedy marked much of her childhood, with her three siblings and mother all dying before Elizabeth's thirteenth year.  As she was the only one of the judge's children who would live to adulthood, her father doted on her, being charged by his dying wife to "...be both a mother and father..." to the young girl. Judge Bacon, nearly ten years later, stated "I have ever felt the force of these words... I feel the responsibility beyond anything in my life before or since."

Elizabeth Bacon was both beautiful and intelligent, graduating from a girls' seminary in June 1862 at the head of her class. Her father hoped she would make a good marriage with a man from her own elevated social status, and she rejected several suitors.

She had briefly encountered her future husband George Armstrong Custer as a child, and socially met him again in the autumn of 1862, when he had returned to Monroe on leave from the first year of the American Civil War. He later wrote that he fell deeply in love with her as of their first formal meeting. She eventually returned these feelings, but her father refused to allow then-Captain Custer into the Bacon home or to permit her to meet him outside it, much less get married, as George proposed in the final week of 1862. He was from a poor, undistinguished family, and the judge hoped his daughter would have better than the life of an army wife. After Custer, just prior to the Battle of Gettysburg (where he played a significant role), was promoted to Brevet brigadier general, Judge Bacon finally relented and they were married in Monroe at the First Presbyterian Church on February 9, 1864.

Married life 
Elizabeth Custer and her husband George had a loving but tumultuous relationship. Both were stubborn, opinionated, and ambitious. Their private correspondence was filled with sexually charged double entendres.

... we gave ourselves the privilege of a swift gallop... I never noticed the surroundings until I found we were almost in the midst of an Indian village, quite hidden under the bluff.  My heart literally stood still.  I watched the general furtively.  He was as usual perfectly unmoved, and yet he well knew that this was the country where it was hardly considered that the Indian was overburdened with hospitality. ...

The next day the general thought I might rather not go with him than run the risk of such frights; but I well knew there was something far worse than fears for my own personal safety.  It is infinitely worse to be left behind, a prey to all the horrors of imagining what may be happening to one we love.  You eat your heart slowly out with such anxiety, and to endure such suspense is simply the hardest of all trials that come to the soldier's wife.

— Elizabeth 'Libbie' Custer, from her first book Boots and Saddles, on her life and adventures with her husband.

After the war, George reverted from his wartime rank of major general to his Regular Army rank of lieutenant colonel, although he did receive a brevet (honorary) promotion to major general which allowed him to wear the uniform and insignia of that rank.  He was assigned to a series of dreary and unsatisfying assignments in Texas, Kansas, and the Dakota Territory. Life on the frontier outposts was difficult, and his career was plagued by problems including a court martial (brought about by his leaving the field to be with his wife).

The 1876 campaign against the Sioux seemed like a chance for glory to George Armstrong Custer. The couple's final home together was at Fort Abraham Lincoln near what is now Bismarck, North Dakota. From there, the general led the Seventh Cavalry in pursuit of Sitting Bull, Crazy Horse and the Sioux and Northern Cheyenne who refused to be confined to the reservation system.

Defender of her husband's legacy 
After her husband and 5 of the 12 companies of the 7th Cavalry were wiped out at the Battle of the Little Big Horn in June 1876, many in the press, Army, and government criticized him for blundering into a massacre. President Ulysses S. Grant publicly blamed him for the disaster. Fearing that her husband would be made a scapegoat by history, Elizabeth Custer launched a one-woman campaign to rehabilitate her husband's image. Her assistance to Frederick Whittaker, the author of the first biography of George, helped enable the rapid production of the popular book, which praised George's career and set the tone for future biographers in the decades ahead.

Elizabeth began writing articles and making speaking engagements praising the glory of what she presented as her "martyred" husband. Her three books—Boots and Saddles (1885), Tenting on the Plains—(1887), and Following the Guidon (1890)  aimed at glorifying her husband's memory and were ultimately slanted in George's favor.

Elizabeth remained utterly devoted to her husband and never remarried. Despite having spent her life traveling extensively throughout the United States (including winters in Florida) and the world, she never visited the valley of Little Big Horn. She was said to treasure a letter from President Theodore Roosevelt who stated that her husband was "one of my heroes" and "a shining light to all the youth of America." In later decades, historians reexamined George's actions leading up to and during the battle and found much to criticize.

After an initial period of distress dealing with her late husband's debts, Elizabeth spent her over a half-century of widowhood in financial comfort attained as the result of her literary career and lecture tours, leaving an estate of over $100,000. She died in New York City, four days before her 91st birthday, on April 4, 1933, and was buried next to her husband at West Point. A few years before her death she told a writer that her greatest disappointment was that she never had a son to bear her husband's honored name.

Portrayals in movies and television 
Elizabeth Custer was portrayed by actress Olivia de Havilland in the 1941 film They Died with their Boots On, by Mary Ure in the 1967 film Custer of the West, by Blythe Danner in the 1977 television movie The Court Martial of George Armstrong Custer, and by Rosanna Arquette in the 1991 television mini-series Son of the Morning Star.

Notes and references

External links
 Libby Custer, Wife Of Union General George Armstrong Custer

 
 
 
Custer Writes of Secret Engagement to Libbie, Original Letter Shapell Manuscript Foundation

Custer Battlefield Museum, Garryowen, Montana – Home of the Elizabeth Bacon Custer Manuscript Archive

1842 births
1933 deaths
Elizabeth Bacon
People from Monroe, Michigan
People of Michigan in the American Civil War
American women writers
Burials at West Point Cemetery
Writers from Michigan